Alex McDade (1905–1937) was a Glasgow poet and labourer who  went to Spain to fight with XV International Brigade in the Spanish Civil War. He was a political commissar with the British Battalion and wounded at the Battle of Jarama in February 1937. He was killed on the first day of the Battle of Brunete at Villanueva de la Cañada on 6 July 1937. He wrote the poem "Valley of Jarama".

References

Jump, Jim (ed). Poets from Spain: British and Irish International Brigaders on the Spanish Civil War London: Lawrence & Wishart (2006) 

1905 births
1937 deaths
Writers from Glasgow
British people of the Spanish Civil War
Military personnel killed in the Spanish Civil War